John Forster Alcock (14 April 1841 – 13 March 1910) was an influential English sportsman and football organiser. He was founder of Football Association and FA Committee-member in 1863 – 1866.

Biography 
John Forster Alcock was born in Sunderland in 1841 to Charles Alcock (1807–1881) – a ship-owner and ship-broker – and Elizabeth Forster (1825–1891). He was the eldest child of 9 and the family lived on Norfolk Street (otherwise known as Sunniside), Sunderland and on the same street lived an uncle who headed the Alcock family's upholstery business. The Alcock family relocated prior to the 1861 census to the London area and both John Forster Alcock and Charles William Alcock (his younger brother) attended Harrow School.

Less is known of John Forster Alcock than his brother Charles, but he was a ship-owner and ship-broker who represented the Forest Club at the meetings that led to the foundation of the FA in 1863. He served on the committee of the FA until 1866 when he was replaced by Charles himself.

John Forster Alcock died aged 68 in 1910.

Family 
John Forster Alcock married Catherine Ruth Rouse (1848–1891) in 1867 and they divorced in 1874. He then married Augusta Lackland White (1867–1956) in Hampstead in 1886 and they went on to have three children: 
Frank Alcock (1887–1917 Rhodesia Rifles attached Kings African Rifles<CWGC>), 
Augusta Theodora Alcock (1888-unknown), 
John Forster Alcock (1896–1977).

References
Notes

Bibliography

†Alcock, Charles. Football: our winter game. 1874.
Booth, Keith. The Father of Modern Sport: The Life and Times of Charles W. Alcock, Parrs Wood Press. 2002.

External links
British Football Legends profile
An English Football Internationals' Who's Who by Douglas Lamming (Hutton Press 1990

1841 births
1910 deaths
Footballers from Sunderland
People educated at Harrow School
Creators of association football
Founders of association football institutions
English footballers
History of football in England
Wanderers F.C. players
English football referees
Association football forwards